Seth Davy, sometimes spelled Seth Davey, was a black street entertainer who worked in Liverpool, England, at the turn of the 20th century, and was immortalised in the folk song "Whiskey on a Sunday".

Little is known of Davy outside of the lyrics of the song, which themselves have been varied over the years, with his location sometimes even changed to Dublin (Beggar's Bush) or London (Shepherd's Bush) from the original Bevington Bush in Liverpool. No one is recorded in public records with the precise name of Seth Davy. This vagueness had led to the assumption that the character was imaginary, although many Liverpudlians claimed to have seen him in person.

But Seth Davy certainly existed. Fritz Spiegl possessed a lantern slide clearly showing a poor black street entertainer with three jig dolls at Bevington Bush, surrounded by children. Popular belief is that Seth Davy was West Indian, possibly Jamaican, though Ray Costello in his Black History, a history of Liverpool's black population, says that he was West African. Planters from Devon, England are known to have introduced the surname Davy into Jamaica. The existence of the Davy surname amongst black Jamaicans supports the belief that Seth Davy was from Jamaica. A correspondent to the Liverpool Echo in 1957, claimed he was from Port Antonio in Jamaica.

Davy sang 'Massa is a stingy man', from the repertoire of Dan Emmett, one of the stars of American minstrelsy, which contains the lines:

Gallery

References

External links
Liverpool & South West Lancs Genealogy, Seth Davy discussion
A Liverpool folksong a week, blogspot

Entertainers from Liverpool
English singers
English puppeteers
Musicians from Liverpool
Songs about Liverpool
English people of Jamaican descent